Greatest Hits is the second compilation album by American country music group Restless Heart. It was released by RCA Nashville in 1998. "No End to This Road" and "For Lack of Better Words", two tracks new to this album, were released as singles, and "Somebody's Gonna Get That Girl"  is new to this album as well. The album reached #47 on the Top Country Albums chart. Prior to the release of this album, the band had been disbanded since 1994. This album reunited all of the members save for keyboardist Dave Innis, and after its release, Restless Heart disbanded again until 2004's Still Restless.

Track listing

Personnel 
On "No End to This Road", "For Lack of Better Words", and "Somebody's Gonna Get That Girl":

Restless Heart
 John Dittrich – vocals
 Paul Gregg – vocals
 Greg Jennings – acoustic guitar, electric guitar, vocals 
 Larry Stewart – lead vocals

Additional musicians
 Bill Cuomo – keyboards
 John Barlow Jarvis – keyboards
 Michael Rhodes – bass 
 Greg Morrow – drums

Chart performance

References

1998 greatest hits albums
Restless Heart albums
Albums produced by Scott Hendricks
RCA Records compilation albums